The 2007 CONCACAF Champions' Cup was the 42nd edition of the annual international club football competition held in the CONCACAF region (North America, Central America and the Caribbean), the CONCACAF Champions' Cup. It determined that year's club champion of association football in the CONCACAF region. The tournament also served as a qualifying event for the 2007 FIFA Club World Cup.

Pachuca won the Champions' Cup, defeating Guadalajara 7–6 on penalties following a 2–2 aggregate draw.

In addition, as runners-up, Guadalajara was invited to CONMEBOL's 2007 Copa Sudamericana.

Qualified teams

North American zone
 Pachuca – 2006 Clausura champion
 Guadalajara – 2006 Apertura champion
 Houston Dynamo – 2006 MLS Cup champion
 D.C. United – 2006 MLS Supporters' Shield winner

Central America zone
 Puntarenas – UNCAF champion
 Olimpia – UNCAF runner-up
 Marquense – UNCAF third place

Caribbean zone
 W Connection – 2006 CFU Club Championship winner

Bracket

Quarterfinals

Pachuca won 3–0 on aggregate.

Houston Dynamo won 2–1 on aggregate.

Guadalajara won 4–2 on aggregate.

D.C. United won 7–3 on aggregate.

Semifinals

Note: The first leg match scheduled for 14 March 2007 was postponed due to a weather-induced power outage.

Pachuca won 5–4 on aggregate.

Guadalajara won 3–2 on aggregate.

Final

First leg

Second leg

2–2 on aggregate. Pachuca won 2007 CONCACAF Champions' Cup 7–6 on penalties, advanced to 2007 FIFA Club World Cup.

Champions

Top scorers

Notes
 C.F. Pachuca advances to 2007 FIFA Club World Cup as champion.
 Guadalajara advances to 2007 Copa Sudamericana as runner-up.
 D.C. United advances to 2007 Copa Sudamericana by finishing third place(total goal difference +3 vs. Houston Dynamo 0) as the non-Mexico representative from CONCACAF.

References

External links
 Official rosters
 FIFA.com Champion's Cup article

1
CONCACAF Champions' Cup